Gustav Jäger (June 23, 1832 – May 13, 1917) was a German naturalist and hygienist.

Biography
He was born at the historic Pfarrhaus in the village of Bürg, Neuenstadt am Kocher in Württemberg. After studying medicine at Tübingen, he became a teacher of zoology in Vienna. In 1868, he was appointed professor of zoology at the academy of Hohenheim, and subsequently he became teacher of zoology and anthropology at Stuttgart Polytechnic and professor of physiology at the Veterinary School. In 1884, he abandoned teaching and started practice as a physician in Stuttgart. He wrote various works on biological subjects, including Die Darwinsche Theorie und ihre Stellung zu Moral und Religion (1869), and Lehrbuch der allgemeinen Zoologie (1871–1878). Jäger was an early supporter of Darwinism.

In 1876, he suggested a hypothesis in explanation of heredity, resembling the germ plasm theory subsequently elaborated by August Weismann, to the effect that the germinal protoplasm retains its specific properties from generation to generation, dividing in each reproduction into an ontogenetic portion, out of which the individual is built up, and a phylogenetic portion, which is reserved to form the reproductive material of the mature offspring.

In Die Entdeckung der Seele ("The Discovery of The Soul", 1878), Jäger advanced the first crude version of the pheromone concept. His postulated skin, "anthropines," popularly dubbed as "lust compounds," came astoundingly close to reality but the idea was too far ahead of the possibilities of chemistry and the life sciences at this time to be corroborated by experiments.

The system of clothing associated with his name originates from Die Normalkleidung als Gesundheitsschutz ("Standardized Apparel For Health Protection" (1880)), wherein he advocated the wearing of rough fabrics, such as wool, "close to the skin," objecting especially to the use of any kind of plant fibre. The teachings of Jäger inspired the creation of the Jaeger clothing brand.

From the 1860s on, Jäger immersed himself in popularizing science through print media, associations, and the founding of a public aquarium and small zoo in Vienna.  In 1881, he founded his own magazine devoted to spreading his idea about health reform (Prof. Dr. G. Jägers Monatsblatt).

He also was a very active entomologist specialising in beetles particularly Buprestidae and Scarabaeidae. He wrote with Carl Gustav Calwer Käferbuch-Naturgeschichte der Käfer Europas (Beetle Book: Natural History of Europe's Beetles). This very popular work was successively reprinted until 1916. His beetle collection is in the Stuttgart Natural History Museum.

Notes

References
Andreas Daum, Wissenschaftspopularisierung im 19. Jahrhundert: Bürgerliche Kultur, naturwissenschaftliche Bildung und die deutsche Öffentlichkeit, 1848–1914. Munich: Oldenbourg, 1998.
Schawaller, W. 1994: [Jäger, G.] Stuttg. Beitr. Naturk. Ser. A (Biol.), Stuttgart (Nr. 508 1-40)
Schenkling, S. 1933: [Jäger, G.] Ent. Blätter 29 28-30

External links

DEI ZALF Portrait

1832 births
1917 deaths
People from Neuenstadt am Kocher
People from the Kingdom of Württemberg
19th-century German biologists
German entomologists
Physicians from Stuttgart